The Women's Volleyball tournament at the 2013 Mediterranean Games will be held in Mersin from 22 June to 30 June 2013. Preliminaries were held at Toroslar Sports Hall, while the finals were held at Servet Tazegül Arena.

Competition Formula

The 6 teams were divided into two pools and will play a round-robin tournament.

The top four of the following teams progress to the Semi Finals.

Preliminary round

Pool A

Pool B

Elimination round

Championship bracket

Fifth place match

Semifinals

Bronze medal match

Gold medal match

Final standings

References

Wom